Anil Kumar (born 1958) is an American management consultant.

Anil Kumar may also refer to:

In arts and media
Anil Kumar (film director) (born 1963)
Anil V. Kumar (born 1975), television and film director and producer
G. Anil Kumar (born 1972), journalist, columnist and writer

In politics
Anil Kumar (Uttar Pradesh politician) (born 1975)
Anil Kumar (Bihar politician) (born 1960)
Anil Kumar Eravathri, Indian politician
Anil Kumar Jha (born 1969), Nepalese politician
Anil Kumar Yadav (politician, born 1956), Indian
Anil Kumar Yadav (politician, born 1960), Indian

In sport
Anil Kumar (discus thrower) (born 1975)
Anil Kumar (footballer) (born 1986)
Anil Kumar (judoka) (born 1984)
Anil Kumar (wrestler, born 1979)
Anil Kumar (wrestler, born 1971)
Anil Kumar Prakash (born 1978), sprinter

In other fields
Anil Kumar (born 1958), American management consultant
Anil Kumar (physicist) (born 1941)

See also